The men's 3000 metres steeplechase event at the 1990 World Junior Championships in Athletics was held in Plovdiv, Bulgaria, at Deveti Septemvri Stadium on 10 and 12 August.

Medalists

Results

Final
12 August

Heats
10 August

Heat 1

Heat 2

Participation
According to an unofficial count, 26 athletes from 20 countries participated in the event.

References

3000 metres steeplechasechase
Steeplechase at the World Athletics U20 Championships